The Ramrajatala railway station in the Indian state of West Bengal, serves Ramrajatala, in Howrah, West Bengal. It is on the Howrah–Kharagpur line.

History
The Howrah–Kharagpur line was opened in 1900. There is very important railway station but a large number of people work from nearby villages and towns through the station.

Tracks
Howrah–Santragachi stretch has four tracks. Howrah–Kharagpur stretch has three tracks.

Electrification
The Howrah–Kharagpur line was electrified in 1967–69.

References

External links
Trains at Ramrajatala

Railway stations in Howrah district
Kolkata Suburban Railway stations